Gerard Martin 'Gerry' Crawley (born 3 July 1962) was a Scottish footballer who played for Queen's Park, Dumbarton, Brechin City and St Johnstone.

Post career
Gerry was voted onto the committee of Queen's Park by club members and presently holds the position of Club President, a position which he retains till May 2020.

References

1962 births
Scottish footballers
Dumbarton F.C. players
Queen's Park F.C. players
Brechin City F.C. players
St Johnstone F.C. players
Scottish Football League players
Living people
Footballers from Glasgow
Association football forwards
St Roch's F.C. players
Scottish Junior Football Association players